The Mazda MPV (Multi-Purpose Passenger Vehicle) is a minivan manufactured by Mazda. Introduced in 1988 as a rear-wheel-drive model with optional selectable four-wheel drive, this was replaced in 1999 with a front-wheel-drive version with optional all-wheel-drive in some markets. Over one million MPV models have been produced since its introduction.

First generation (LV; 1988)

The MPV was designed from the ground-up as a minivan specifically for the American market, and was introduced in 1988 for the 1989 model year. It was based on the large rear-wheel-drive Mazda Luce's platform. The platform allowed such options as a V6 engine, and optional four-wheel drive. However this large platform created some liabilities in other markets. When it was introduced in Japan in January 1990, its engine displacement and exterior dimensions exceeded Japanese government regulations for vehicles classified as "compact", and as a result, Japanese buyers were liable for additional annual taxes. It was available at Mazda's Japanese luxury dealership network Ɛ̃fini starting in 1991.

Its selectable 4WD system is not to be confused with all road conditions "all-wheel-drive" systems; the MPV can be switched into locked 4WD with a switch mounted on the column gear selector. A dash mounted switch controlled the center differential, creating a locked power distributions on the front and rear axles. The 4WD is not for use on dry roads, but can be engaged and disengaged while moving. Its efficient use of interior space while offering a relatively small exterior drew from Mazda's experience with space efficient one-box minivans, like the Mazda Bongo.

Unlike other minivans, the MPV's parking brake was directly on the floor beside the driver's seat and operated by the hand, when most other minivans had the parking brake in the driver footwell area and operated by the left foot. Like the later Honda Odyssey introduced in North America in early 1995, it featured traditional hinged doors instead of sliding rear doors, though the original MPV only had a single rear door. This was also the only Mazda MPV generation sold in North America with a manual transmission, offered in the '89 through '91 model years. The middle row was available as a 3-person bench, allowing seating for eight, when most minivans only seated seven. Because of the MPV's optional 4WD, the Mazda Navajo version of the Ford Explorer (sold from 1990 to 1994) was only offered as a two-door, so as to minimize internal competition.

The van was named to Car and Driver magazine's Ten Best list for 1990 and 1991 and featured as one of their "vehicles for the coming (fuel) crisis". Initial sales were strong as well, but rapidly fell off once other makers introduced all-wheel drive and V6 engines. In the years to come, Toyota's 1991 Previa, Nissan's 1993 Quest, and Honda's 1995 Odyssey had entered the market and began diluting Mazda's market share. Sales weren't helped when the MPV received one star out of four in the Australian Australasian New Car Assessment Program (ANCAP) crash tests and a "Marginal" rating in the American Insurance Institute for Highway Safety (IIHS) crash tests for damage to the occupant compartment, tire intrusion into the driver footwell area, poor dummy kinematics, and possibility of injuries to both legs.

In 1992 for the 1993 model year, a new Mazda emblem and a remote keyless entry system were introduced. A standard driver's airbag was later introduced in early 1993.

The van was facelifted in 1995 for the 1996 model year, adding driver's side rear door, passenger side airbag, and extending the nose for improved crash protection. While the four-cylinder engine was retired for the American and Canadian markets, it was replaced with a similar but somewhat smaller 2.5 L unit for the rest of the world. A mild refresh was introduced in 1997 for the 1998 model year with "all-sport" body cladding and wheel arches, and polished alloy wheels. Mazda discontinued the original MPV after the 1998 model year for North America, and after the 1999 model year for the rest of the world.

Second generation (LW; 1999)

The MPV was replaced in June 1999, using the short-wheelbase, front-wheel-drive platform, with the optional 4WD system discontinued in most markets, or replaced with an all-conditions all-wheel-drive system in some markets. It now featured dual sliding rear doors equipped with roll-down windows and a third row seat that could fold and tumble into a floor recess much like the Honda Odyssey. In the North American markets, the MPV was set apart from other minivans by its comparatively sporty chassis.

At introduction, the MPV used the same 170 hp DOHC 2.5 L Ford Duratec V6 unit that powered the Ford Contour and Mercury Mystique and Cougar. DX models featured a two-place middle bench seat. The LX model featured two middle buckets with a feature whereby the passenger side seat could slide sideways (marketed as "side by slide"), power windows and locks, heated power mirrors, privacy glass, and antilock brakes. The ES model added leather seating surfaces, wood tone interior trim, side impact air bags on the front seats, bigger wheels, and dual zone front and rear air conditioners.

In model year 2001, all models added child-safety seat tether anchors. An optional GFX sport appearance package was made available for LX and ES models, which included fog lights and aero body add-ons. The 2001 model year ran long, extending into early 2002 in anticipation of the 2002 refresh.

In the Japanese and other markets, the 2.0 and 2.5-liter four-cylinders were replaced by the new 2.3 L L3-VE direct injection (DISI) inline four, as first seen in the all-new Mazda6.

In model year 2003, power operation of the side doors was made optional on the LX and ES. A base LX-SV model was added midway into the model year.

In model year 2004, the MPV received a mild exterior and interior makeover. The exterior featured new headlights and Altezza style clear taillights. Interior changes included a new steering wheel, gauge surrounds, and a spring assist to ease folding the third row seat into the floor. The LX Sport package added a customized look with alloy wheels, body side skirts, enhanced tail lights, anti-lock brakes, an air dam under the bumper, and an optional rear-mounted spoiler. The ES model added leather seats, rear air conditioner, power sliding doors, and a choice of moonroof or roof-mounted DVD player. No LX-SV model was offered.

In model year 2005, dual zone air conditioning became an optional feature on the LX (it had been standard on the LX in 2004).

In model year 2006, a base LX-SV model was again offered alongside the LX and ES models.

The MPV was discontinued in both Europe and North America after model year 2006. The MPV was also replaced in North America and Australia by the full-size Mazda CX-9 crossover SUV. Australian models were available with three seats in the second row, and two seats in the third row instead of a folding third row.

Engines:
 1999–2002 2.0 L FS-DE I4 (non-US)
 1999–2002 2.5 L GY-DE V6 (non-US)
 2002–2006 3.0 L AJ V6
 2002–2005 2.3 L MZR 2.3 Direct Injection Spark Ignition (DISI) I4 (non-US)
 2002–2005 2.0 L MZR RF common rail turbo-diesel I4 (Europe)

For 2006, the base MSRP for MPV models was LX-SV ($22,115), LX:(22,950) and ES ($28,515).

The Mazda MPV earned an "Acceptable" rating in the IIHS offset frontal crash test in 2000 for fair structural performance and very high forces on the dummy's right foot. In 2005, it earned a "Poor" rating in the side-impact crash test without the optional side airbags, indicating that high injuries to the driver and rear occupant are possible.

Third generation (LY; 2006)

In February 2006, the third generation Mazda MPV went on sale in Japan, having debuted earlier in October 2005 at the Tokyo Motor Show. It was powered by either a four-cylinder MZR Direct Injection Spark Ignition (DISI) 2.3-litre naturally aspirated engine or the turbo version of the same. The second row reclining seats featured an unusual retracting footrest feature. The gear shift was moved from the steering column to the center console, much like most other minivans by Japanese automakers today. The launch of the third generation MPV was famously known for its television commercials narrated by a middle-aged woman saying the tagline, "Supōtsukā no hassō de, miniban wo kaeru." (スポーツカーの発想で、ミニバンを変える。The idea of a sports car - inherited by a minivan.)

The third generation MPV was available only in Japan, China, Hong Kong, Macau, Thailand, Indonesia, Singapore, Malaysia and New Zealand. It was known as the Mazda8 in Hong Kong, Macau, Indonesia, Singapore and Malaysia. The 4WD and Turbo models are available only in the domestic (Japanese) market, while all export models (usually known as Mazda8) are naturally aspirated FWD models only. In New Zealand, it was known as the MPV and is available in four-cylinder only.

It was not sold to North America, Europe and other LHD markets besides China. The Mazda CX-9 (North America and Australasia only) and Mazda5 filled the segment gap in these markets.

In 2008, a facelifted version was introduced. External modifications include a new front bumper with new fog lights. A five-speed automatic transaxle replaced the four-speed unit used in NA FWD models. Six-speed Automatics remained in the turbo and 4WD models.

Turbo models were discontinued in 2010. A Malaysian version was introduced that year, making this the fourth market in which the third generation Mazda MPV was to be sold.

In 2012, a 2.5L engine version mated with five-speed automatic replaced the 2.3L with four-speed in China.

References

External links
 YahooAutos – 2006 Mazda MPV 
 AutomobileMagazine – 2005 Mazda MPV (review) 
 Jalopnik - 2004 Mazda MPV, a High Mileage Hero
 MPV Club
 Mazda announces 1 million built, introduces gen3 and planned turbo version for Japan
 Mazda MPV Tuning Germany 
 Mazda MPV Tuning Russia

MPV
Minivans
All-wheel-drive vehicles
Front-wheel-drive vehicles
Rear-wheel-drive vehicles
1980s cars
1990s cars
2000s cars
Cars introduced in 1988
Cars discontinued in 2016